Ostermeyer is a German surname. Notable people with the surname include:

 Elisabeth Ostermeyer (born 1929), German gymnast
 Kilasu Ostermeyer (born 1997), Thai-born German badminton player
 Micheline Ostermeyer (1922-2001), French athlete and concert pianist
 Peter Ostermeyer (born 1943), German chess master

German-language surnames